The Konkan Division is the administrative division in the coastal region of the Indian state of Maharashtra. It has a diverse number of ethnic and religious communities.

Communities
Agri
Bhandari
Neo-Buddhists
Chitpavan
Chaukalshi
Daivadnya
Gaud Saraswat Brahmin
Bombay East Indians
Kayastha Prabhu
Kunbi
Kupari
Kumbhar
Pathare Prabhu
Somvanshi Kshatriya Pathare
Samvedi Brahmin
Konkani Muslims
Siddis
Bene Israel

References

Konkan division
People from Maharashtra